At the Mountains of Madness is a novella by H.P. Lovecraft.

At the Mountains of Madness or Mountain of Madness may also refer to:

Music
"At the Mountains of Madness", a 1968 song by the psychedelic rock group H. P. Lovecraft from H. P. Lovecraft II
"At the Mountains of Madness" (album), a 1971 album by the Australian rock group Blackfeather
At the Mountains of Madness (EP), a 1997 EP by Orphanage
Electric Masada: At the Mountains of Madness, a 2005 album by Electric Masada

Other uses
At the Mountains of Madness and Other Novels, a collection of Lovecraft's work
Dark Adventure Radio Theatre: At the Mountains of Madness, a 2006 radio performance of Lovecraft's At the Mountains of Madness
Mountain of Madness, an episode of The Simpsons
The Mountains of Madness, an audio/visual musical adaptation of the works of H.P. Lovecraft

See also
 In the Mouth of Madness (disambiguation)